The 12855 / 56 Bilaspur - Itwari InterCity SF Express is a Superfast Express train belonging to Indian Railways South East Central Railway zone that runs between  and Itwari Junction in India.

Coaches
The 12855 / 56 Bilaspur - Itwari Intercity Express has one AC 1 Tier, two AC 2 Tier, two AC 3 Tier, seven Sleeper Class, five general unreserved & two SLR (seating with luggage rake) coaches . It does not carry a pantry car coach.

As is customary with most train services in India, coach composition may be amended at the discretion of Indian Railways depending on demand.

Service

Routing

Traction
As the route is electrified, a  based WAP-7 electric locomotive pulls the train to its destination.

Rake Sharing
Bilaspur - Itwari Intercity Superfast Express has the sharing of rakes with 18239/40 Gevra Road-Itwari-Bilaspur Shivnath Express & 58212 Bilaspur - Gevra Road Passenger.

References

External links
12855 Intercity Express at India Rail Info
12856 Intercity Express at India Rail Info

Intercity Express (Indian Railways) trains
Transport in Bilaspur, Chhattisgarh
Rail transport in Chhattisgarh
Rail transport in Maharashtra
Transport in Nagpur